Forever Young is a TV series produced by the Vietnam Television Film Production Center – Vietnam Television in cooperation with CJ E&M Pictures – South Korea by Nguyen Khai Anh, Bui Tien Huy and Myung Hyun Woo as directors.

The film consists of two parts: Part one is 36 episodes and Season Two is 38 episodes.

Plot

Part 1 
Thuy Linh – a beautiful, innocent girl that is pampered by her parents has realized her dream of coming to Korea to study and satisfy her passion for K-pop and Korean culture. Linh entered an independent life in a foreign country starting with winning a scholarship at a university in Seoul. Incidentally sharing the inn with Khanh, Mai and Junsu – the son of the beautiful but rebellious hostess, Linh has had many difficulties when Junsu is the star who always brings trouble for her. It was thought that as many people with different personalities and preferences living under one roof would not be reconciled, but all four of them and other friends overcame all disagreements and had a good time. Remember with full of happy and sad memories, so that when we look back, everyone will not regret having lived their best in their youth.

In Korea, Linh and Junsu gradually develop feelings for each other and after that, they fall in love. Junsu does not realize Miso's feelings. Meanwhile, Linh did not know that Khanh was liking her. An incident occurred that caused Linh's family to go bankrupt, her home was lost, her mother was in a coma because of a brain hemorrhage, so Linh had to go back to Vietnam urgently without meeting again. Junsu was shocked but couldn't do anything because he decided to pursue his career.

Part 2 
Linh brought Junsu back to debut with her parents. At first, they were very angry and strongly opposed; however, after that, they become sympathetic towards Junsu. Turns out again when Junsu has a traffic accident and loses his memory. He was forced to go to America for surgery and there, he met Cynthia. The two began to date each other in the pain and helplessness of Linh. She was forced to stop with Junsu because she wanted him to live well in the present.

Linh got into work and she was transferred to Danang. There, she happens to meet Junsu again after 4 years and Cynthia — Junsu's previous fiancee. His indifferent attitude towards Linh made Linh very suffering. Besides the love story, Linh also has trouble in her relationship with director Phong. Phong gradually fell in love with Linh while Cythina learned of the love story between Linh and Junsu through Khanh's story, and started to "be alert" to Linh. Private romantic relationships become more complicated.

Character

Main characters 

 Thùy Linh (played by Nhã Phương): Being the only child in a well-off family, Linh was loved by her parents. She loves Korean culture and especially the music of this country. Linh won a scholarship to study in the country of kimchi and here, she has extremely memorable memories of a beautiful youth.
 Lee Jun-su (played by Kang Tae-oh): is the son of the innkeeper. This guy has an attractive appearance with dancing skills and a good voice. He is also a trainee at the most popular KM entertainment company in Korea. Junsu's life has been turned upside down since the first moment Thuy Linh appeared in his life
 Khánh (played by Hồng Đăng): is an elite student coming to Korea to study for a Master's degree with a Government scholarship. However, Khanh's goal is to find information about his Korean father. Khanh met Linh for the first time with lots of troubles. He himself did not expect his fate and Linh's fate associated with each other since then
 Cynthia (played by Jung Hae-na): The person Junsu fell in love with in America after losing his memory. She is a formidable opponent to Linh for Junsu's feelings, more than Miso was.
 Phong (played by  Mạnh Trường): Phong is Linh's director at a resort in Danang. Although he has feelings for Linh, but instead, Linh only considers him a colleague.

Supporting character 

 Mai (played by Kim Tuyến): is a teacher at an international high school in Korea. Mai helped Linh from the very first days to Korea and is someone she can share a lot about both emotions and life. Since then, she and Jiyong have also become husband and wife
 Ji-yong (played by Shin Jae-ha): is a rebellious high school student who acts against his teacher. Jiyong has caused Mai a headache many times, but due to Mai's tenderness and sincerity, his pupil Jiyong has gradually turned into a touch.
 Mi-so (played by Shin Hye-sun): She is a personality, smart and unrequited girl with Junsu during the time sitting on the lecture hall. However, she never dared to express her feelings and for Junsu, Miso is always just a close friend.
 Sung-jae (played by Lee Kyu-bok): He is best friends with Junsu and Miso, the three being a group. Sungjae lives an optimistic and happy life, but many times he makes Junsu and Miso crazy
 Jun-hee (played by Roh Haeng-ha): Junhee is Junsu's younger sister, goes to the same school and has a special love for Jiyong
 Jun-su's father (played by Son Jong-hak)
 Jun-su's mother (played by Lee Ah-hyun)
 Linh's father (played by Trọng Trinh): He is both a father-in-law and a person who cares about his family.
 Linh's mother (played by Minh Hoa): She is a mother who cares about her family, but sometimes has a hoarse voice, scolds Linh and is the one who takes care of the

Rating

Part 2

Prize

References 

2014 Vietnamese television series debuts
2010s South Korean television series
2010s Vietnamese television series
South Korean drama television series
Vietnamese drama television series
2017 South Korean television series endings
MBC TV original programming
MBC TV television dramas
2014 South Korean television series debuts